The Order of Malta is a sovereign entity of international law that does not have its own territory. It is a permanent non-state observer to the United Nations. It maintains diplomatic relations with over 100 countries. Some of these are hosts of SMOM Embassies, but there are delegations that are accredited to state other than their location, and also there are countries with established diplomatic or official relations, but mission, resident or non-resident.

Accreditations
 (Diplomatic mission operating from Washington D.C., USA)
 (Diplomatic mission operating from Delray Beach, Florida, USA)
 (SMOM Ambassador to Bangkok also accredited to Cambodia)
 (Diplomatic mission operating from Estoril, Portugal)
	(Diplomatic mission operating from France)
	(Diplomatic mission operating from Belgium)
 (SMOM Ambassador to Caracas also accredited to Guyana)
	 (SMOM Ambassador to Santo Domingo also accredited to Haiti)
 (Diplomatic mission operating from Port Ludlow, USA)
 (Diplomatic mission operating from France)
 (SMOM Ambassador to Vienna accredited also to Moldova)
 (Diplomatic mission operating from Miami, USA)

Relations established, no accreditation
 (diplomatic)
 (diplomatic)
 (diplomatic)
 (diplomatic)
 (diplomatic)
 (diplomatic)
 (diplomatic)
 (diplomatic)
 (diplomatic)
 (diplomatic)
 (diplomatic)
 (diplomatic)
 (diplomatic)
 (diplomatic)
 (diplomatic)

See also
 Foreign relations of the Sovereign Military Order of Malta
 List of diplomatic missions of the Sovereign Military Order of Malta

References

External links
List of delegations of SMOM to international organizations
List of diplomatic missions of SMOM to countries - Around the World

Foreign relations of the Sovereign Military Order of Malta